The Servarayan hills, with the anglicised name Shevaroy Hills, are a towering mountain range (1620 m) near the city of Salem, in Tamil Nadu state, southern India. It is one of the major hill stations in Tamil Nadu and in the Eastern Ghats.

The local Tamil name comes from a local deity, Servarayan.

Geography
The Servarayans form part of the southern ranges of the Eastern Ghats System. The main town here is Yercaud. As earlier stated, it also represents the highest peak in southern part of the Eastern Ghats, with the Solaikaradu peak towering to 1620 m above mean sea-level. It is nestled parallel to the lower Chitteri hills - Kalrayan hills, just north of the Kolli Hills and Pachaimalai Hills. Westwards, lie the Mettur hills. This range forms an important link in the  southern part of Eastern Ghats hill chain.

Features
The Servarayan hills have several old coffee plantations, and a sanatorium. The major areas of tourist interest are the Yercaud Orchidarium of the Botanical Survey of India, and the old coffee estates.

Flora and fauna
Some patches of the original forests still exist in the Shevaroy hills and those in higher slopes and peaks contain several endemic species of plants and fauna. The faunal and floral elements high up here have stark similarities to the Western Ghats. Such highlights include Strobilanthes kunthiana (Neelakurinji) in the peaks here, which apart from upper reaches of Western Ghats, is not known from the Eastern Ghats elsewhere. Natural forests apart, coffee and citrus fruits, most notably oranges, are grown in abundance, as well as bananas, pears and jackfruit.

Fauna such as gaur, sambar deer, spotted deer, Indian pangolin, jackals, hares, foxes, mongoose, civets, giant squirrels, and many reptiles including endemic ones such Hemiphyllodactylus aurantiacus, Calotes calotes, Monilesaurus rouxii, Mabuya beddomii and shield tail snake like Uropeltis ellioti and Uropeltis shorttii (which is endemic to the hill range), the endangered Python molurus, Rhabdophis plumbicolor, Calliophis beddomei and Trimeresurus gramineus; endemic amphibians such as Hylarana, Raorchestes, Fejervarya and scores of birds like the whistling thrush, racket-tailed drongo, peacock, shama, Oriental leafbird and Indian grey hornbill occur in Shevaroy Hills.

References

Landforms of Tamil Nadu
Mountain ranges of India
Tourist attractions in Salem district
Eastern Ghats
South Deccan Plateau dry deciduous forests